Erythrina corallodendron, the red bean tree, is a species of flowering plant in the family Fabaceae. It is native to the Caribbean; Jamaica, Hispaniola, Puerto Rico, the Leeward Islands, and the Windward Islands, and has been introduced to Trinidad and Tobago, Kenya, Réunion, and the Malay Peninsula.

References

corallodendron
Ornamental trees
Flora of Jamaica
Flora of the Dominican Republic
Flora of Haiti
Flora of Puerto Rico
Flora of the Leeward Islands
Flora of the Windward Islands
Plants described in 1753
Flora without expected TNC conservation status